William Dunch may refer to:

 William Dunch (1508–1597), English politician
 Sir William Dunch (1578–1611), English politician